The Neville Baronetcy, of Sloley in the County of Norfolk, was a title in the Baronetage of the United Kingdom. It was created on 2 July 1927 for the barrister and Conservative politician Reginald Neville. Born Reginald White, he was the son of James Sewell White, a Judge of the High Court of Calcutta, who assumed the surname Neville by Royal Licence in 1885. He was succeeded by his elder son, the second Baronet, who was the author of The War Letters of a Light Infantryman (1931) and also wrote under the pen-name of 'Gaid Sakit'. The title became extinct on the death of the third Baronet in 1994.

Neville baronets, of Sloley (1927)
Sir Reginald James Neville Neville, 1st Baronet (1863–1950)
Sir James Edmund Henderson Neville, 2nd Baronet (1897–1982)
Sir Richard Lionel John Baines Neville, 3rd Baronet (1921–1994)

Arms

References

Extinct baronetcies in the Baronetage of the United Kingdom